Polyrhaphis baloupae is a species of beetle in the family Cerambycidae. It was described by Santos-Silva, Martins and Tavakilian in 2010.

References

Polyrhaphidini
Beetles described in 2010